Krista Katriina Kiuru (born 5 August 1974) is a Finnish politician. She served as Minister of Housing and Communications and Minister of Education and Communications in Jyrki Katainen's and Alexander Stubb's cabinets. Since June 2019, she has served as the Minister of Family Affairs and Social Services in the Rinne Cabinet and the subsequent Marin Cabinet.

References

External links 
 Krista Kiuru Official Homepage 
 

1974 births
Living people
People from Pori
Social Democratic Party of Finland politicians
Ministers of Education of Finland
Ministers of Social Affairs of Finland
Members of the Parliament of Finland (2007–11)
Members of the Parliament of Finland (2011–15)
Members of the Parliament of Finland (2015–19)
Members of the Parliament of Finland (2019–23)
Women government ministers of Finland
21st-century Finnish women politicians
Women members of the Parliament of Finland